Mike Cote is the president, chief executive officer and director of SecureWorks. SecureWorks became a publicly held company on Friday April 22, 2016, and began trading under the stock symbol SCWX.

History

Cote became chairman and CEO of SecureWorks in February 2002 and led the company through an acquisition by Dell in February 2011. Prior to joining SecureWorks, Cote held executive positions with Talus Solutions,. Cote joined Talus from MSI Solutions, a web application development and systems integration company where he was chief operating officer. Cote's early career included international assignments with KPMG.

He is a graduate of Boston College with a double major in computer science and accounting.

Recognition

 Cote is a certified public accountant and a member of Business Executives for National Security.
 Cote won the Ernst & Young Entrepreneur of the Year 2011 award for Alabama/Georgia/Tennessee in the technology category.

References

Living people
Year of birth missing (living people)